Hua Shaoqing (Simplified Chinese:, born 12 February 1994) is a Chinese long distance runner who specialises in the marathon. She competed in the women's marathon event at the 2016 Summer Olympics.

References

External links
 

1994 births
Living people
Chinese female long-distance runners
Chinese female marathon runners
Athletes (track and field) at the 2016 Summer Olympics
Olympic athletes of China
Runners from Hebei
Sportspeople from Handan